Birendra Kishore Manikya Debbarma Bahadur ascended the throne of the Kingdom of Tripura on 25 November 1909, at the age of 26.

Administrative reforms
Birendra Kishore's contribution to the state lay in his administrative reforms, welfare activities and consistent attempt to spread education. He divided the state into ten administrative units on the model of subdivisions and introduced the system of civil service examinations for recruiting competent youths in the administration in 1909. The post of chief secretary was created in 1909.
 
He reconstituted the State Civil Service in 1909 for recruitment of high officials of the state including the post of Police Superintendent and Deputy Superintendent of Police. The new Arms Act and the Penal Code Amendment Act were passed in 1911. A small staff under a senior Inspector was engaged for detective purposes.  The number of cases reported in the state was always small.

Birendra Kishore took the first initiative to explore the potential of tea cultivation in Tripura by ordering an expert survey. Forty tea estates were set up in Tripura during his rule. The king had given a formal license to the Burma Oil Company in 1916 to explore oil, natural gas and minerals in Tripura after a survey conducted had given indication of potential deposits. He also founded a silk-weaving center at Agartala and took steps to develop agriculture.

Patron of the arts

An artist and prolific songwriter, Birendra Kishore was known for his beautiful oil paintings such as "Sannyasi", "Jhulon" and "Banshi Badan". He founded the Ujjayanta Drama company giving an impetus to the development of theatre in Tripura. The Lakshmi Narayan Temple, 'Durga Bari' and 'Lal Mahal' that form part of the Ujjayanta palace were built during his rule. He built the Pushbanta Place that is now the residence of the Governor of Tripura. King Birendra Kishore organised a grand reception for Rabindra Nath Tagore at Agartala after he had won the Nobel prize for literature in 1913. Apart from providing ongoing financial assistance to Shanti Niketan he also donated 5,000 rupees to Tagore for setting up a hospital at Santi Niketan.

References

External links
Kingdom of Tripura - University of Queensland

Kings of Tripura
History of Tripura
1923 deaths
1880s births